Gerry Bednob (born May 18, 1950) is a Trinidadian-American-Canadian actor and comedian of lndian descent. He graduated with a bachelor's degree in sociology from the University of Toronto, and worked as a high school counselor before turning to comedy and moving to Los Angeles. In his standup acts, Bednob often refers to himself as Bangladeshi, as his grandfather was from a part of East Bengal in British India that is now in present-day Bangladesh.

Bednob has co-starred as "Bling Bling Shelton" in the VH1 comedy series Free Radio and recurred on shows such as Wilfred, Playing House, and Undeclared. He has appeared in films The 40-Year-Old Virgin, Furry Vengeance, Encino Man, Zack and Miri Make a Porno, The Five-Year Engagement, and Walk Hard.

Filmography 
 OFF-TIME (2019) .... Raj
 Deserted (2016 film) (2016) .... Lizard
 The Bet (2016) .... Bob
 Playing House (2014–2017, 7 episodes) .... Mr. Nanjiani
 The Five-Year Engagement (2012) .... Pakistani Chef
 Lizzie (2012) .... Jared
 The Cynical Life of Harper Hall (2011, 3 episodes) .... Rajit
 Wilfred (2011–2013, 6 episodes) .... Mr. Patel
 The Lie (2011) .... Radko
 Politics of Love (2011) .... Vijay Gupta
 Caught (2011) .... Convenience Store Owner
 Honey 2 (2011) .... Mr. Kapoor
 Furry Vengeance (2010) .... Mr. Gupta
 Why Am I Doing This? (2009) .... Ajay
 Lonely Street (2009) .... Bongo
 Shades of Ray (2008) .... Naseem Khaliq
 Zack and Miri Make a Porno (2008) .... Mr. Surya
 Free Radio (2008–2009) .... Bling Bling Shelton
 Kissing Cousins (2008) .... Mr. K
 Witless Protection (2008) .... Omar
 The Golden Door (2008) .... Cabbie
 Walk Hard: The Dewey Cox Story (2007) .... The Maharishi
 Brutal Massacre: A Comedy (2007) .... Hanu Vindepeshs
 Americanizing Shelley (2007) .... Priest
 George Lopez (2007, 1 episode) .... Mr. Gidwani
 The 40-Year-Old Virgin (2005) .... Mooj
 Friday After Next (2002) .... Moly's Father
 Undeclared (2001–2002, 2 episodes) .... Mr. Burundi
 Mad About You (1997, 1 episode) .... Cabbie #2
 Don't Quit Your Day Job (1996) (VG) .... Gupta Chandi
 Monkey Trouble (1994) .... Mr. Rao aka Pet
 Seinfeld (1993, 1 episode) .... Babu's friend
 Encino Man (1992) .... Kashmir
 The Wonder Years (1992, 1 episode) .... Maharishi

References

External links
 
 

1950 births
Living people
Trinidad and Tobago emigrants to Canada
Canadian people of Bangladeshi descent
American people of Bangladeshi descent
American people of Trinidad and Tobago descent